Shooting events at the 1973 Southeast Asian Peninsular Games was held between 2 and 7 September at Mount Vernon Shooting Club, Singapore.

Medal summary

Men's

Medal table

References 
 Yesterday's results
 Yesterday's Seap results
 Yesterday's Seap results
 Yesterday's Seap results
 YESTERDAY'S SEAP RESULTS

Shooting at the Southeast Asian Games